Elections were held in Illinois on Tuesday, November 5, 1940.

Primaries were held April 9, 1940.

While the Democratic ticket of Franklin D. Roosevelt and Henry A. Wallace won the state's electors in the presidential election, the election overall saw significant victories for the Republican Party. The Republican Party retained their control of the Illinois House, and flipped control of the Illinois Senate, as well as control of the executive offices of Governor, Lieutenant Governor, Attorney General, Auditor of Public Accounts, and Treasurer, all of which had previously been under Democratic Party control. Democrats retained their hold on the executive office of Secretary of State. Additionally, Republicans won all seats up for election on the Board of Trustees of the University of Illinois. Republicans also won the state's special United States Senate election and flipped 6 Illinois seats in the United States House of Representatives.

Election information

Turnout
In the primaries, 2,647,467 ballots were cast (1,503,706 Democratic and 1,143,761 Republican).

In the general election, 4,262,196 ballots were cast.

Federal elections

United States President 

Illinois voted for the Democratic ticket of Franklin D. Roosevelt and Henry A. Wallace.

United States Senate 

Republican Charles W. Brooks unseated Democrat James M. Slattery, who had been appointed to the seat left vacant by the death in office of Democrat J. Hamilton Lewis.

United States House 

All 27 Illinois seats in the United States House of Representatives were up for election in 1940.

Republicans flipped six Democratic-held seats, making the composition of Illinois' House delegation 16 Republicans and 11 Democrats.

State elections

Governor

Before the primary, incumbent governor Henry Horner, a Democrat, opted not to seek a third term. In October, before the general election, his death in office made John Henry Stelle assume the governorship. However, Stelle had previously failed to win the Democratic nomination in the primary.

Republican Dwight H. Green won the election.

Democratic primary

Candidates
Harry B. Hershey, former mayor of Taylorville
Albert Lagerstedt, unsuccessful candidate for Democratic nomination in 1938 United States Senate election in Illinois
Robert W. McKinlay
James O. Monroe
John H. Stelle, incumbent lieutenant governor of Illinois

Results

Republican primary

Candidates
Dwight H. Green, Republican nominee for mayor of Chicago in 1939
Richard J. Lyons, former Illinois state representative

General election

Lieutenant Governor

Incumbent lieutenant governor John Henry Stelle, a Democrat, did not seek reelection to a second term, instead opting to run for governor. Republican Hugh W. Cross was elected to succeed him.

Democratic primary

Candidates
Louie E. Lewis, Illinois treasurer
George M. Maypole, Illinois state senator

Results

Republican primary

Candidates
John V. Clinnin, unsuccessful candidate for Republican nomination for lieutenant governor in 1936
Guy C. Crapple
Hugh W. Cross, State Representative
Charles Hindley
William C. Jerome
Arnold L. Lund, Republican nominee for the 6th congressional district in 1934
Earle Benjamin Searcy, Illinois state senator

Results

General election

Attorney General 

 
Incumbent Attorney General John Edward Cassidy, a Democrat appointed in 1938 after fellow Democrat Otto Kerner Sr. resigned to accept a federal judgeship, did not seek reelection to a full term. Republican George F. Barrett was elected to succeed him.

Democratic primary

Republican primary

Candidates
George F. Barrett
Oscar E. Carlstrom, former Illinois attorney general
Frank R. Eagleton, former assistant Illinois attorney general
Charles W. Hadley
Edward A. Hayes,  former commander of The American Legion
George Landon

Results

General election

Secretary of State 

Incumbent second-term Secretary of State Edward J. Hughes, a Democrat, was reelected.

Democratic primary

Republican primary
Justus L. Johnson won the Republican primary, defeating businessman Richard Yates Rowe and Illinois state senator Arthur J. Bidwill.

General election

Auditor of Public Accounts 

Incumbent third-term Auditor of Public Accounts Edward J. Barrett, lost renomination in the Democratic primary. Republican Arthur C. Lueder was elected to succeed him.

Democratic primary
Incumbent Edward J. Barrett narrowly lost renomination to U.S. congressman and former Illinois state treasurer John C. Martin.

Republican primary

Candidates
John William Chapman, former Chicago alderman
Henry G. Hansen
Arthur C. Lueder, former Chicago postmaster and Republican nominee for mayor of Chicago in 1923
William R. McCauley
Oscar Nelson, former Illinois auditor of public accounts, former Chicago alderman, former interim president of the Building Service Employees International Union
Edward A. O'Connor
Charles W. Vail
Edward T. O'Connor

Results

General election

Treasurer 

Incumbent first-term Treasurer Louie E. Lewis, a Democrat, did not seek reelection, instead running for lieutenant governor. Republican Warren Wright was elected to succeed him in office.

Democratic primary

Republican primary

General election

State Senate
Seats of the Illinois Senate were up for election in 1940. Republicans flipped control of the chamber.

State House of Representatives
Seats in the Illinois House of Representatives were up for election in 1940. Republicans retained control of the chamber.

University of Illinois trustees

An election was held for three of the nine seats for Trustees of University of Illinois to six year terms, and a special election was held to fill the partial term of a seat that was vacated. Republicans swept all four seats in the two elections. The election was for six-year terms.

Regular election

An election was held for three six-year terms to the board.

Former two-term Republican member Helen M. H. Grigsby was returned to the board. New Republican members John R. Fornof and Park Livingston were elected to the board.

Incumbent first-term Democrat Marie Coyle Plumb lost reelection.

First-term Democrats Oscar G. Mayer Sr. and Harold Pogue did not seek reelection.

Marie Coyle Plumb was listed on the ballot as "Mrs. Glenn E. Plumb", and Beulah Campbell was listed as "Belulah (Mrs. Bruce A.) Campbell".

Special election

A special election was held to fill the term left vacant by the death in office of Democrat Louis Conrad Moschel in 1940. Republican Chester R. Davis was elected, defeating incumbent Kenny E. Williamson (who had been appointed to hold the seat after the death of Moschel).

Judicial elections
On June 3, 1940, an election was held for judges of the Superior Court of Cook County.

On November 5, 1940, an election was held to fill a vacancy on the Eighth Judicial Circuit.

Ballot measure
A legislatively referred state statute was brought before the voters.

Illinois Banking Law Amendment
Voters approved the Illinois Banking Law Amendment, a legislatively referred state statute which made it easier to establish new banks in small municipalities that lack banks. It amended sections 11 and 12 of the general banking law.

Local elections
Local elections were held.

Notes
 5,806,332½ in regular election and 1,910,902 in special election
 5,957,269½ in regular election and 1,943,117 in special election
 49.16% of regular election and 49.58% of special election
 50.44% of regular election and 50.42% of special election

References

 
Illinois